Holmewood House School is an IAPS independent, co-educational preparatory school for boys and girls aged 3–13, in Langton Green, near Tunbridge Wells, Kent. The building is a Decimus Burton mansion, originally called Mitchells, rebuilt in 1837 after a fire.

Notable former pupils

 Sir Terence Etherton (Master of the Rolls)
 Tristan Gemmill (actor)
 Dan Stevens (actor)
 Hugh Skinner (actor)
 Shane MacGowan (musician, singer with The Pogues)
 Justin Chancellor (musician Tool (band))
 Femi Fani-Kayode (Nigerian lawyer and politician)
 Andy Zaltzman (pun expert and comedian)
 Herbert Addo (Ghanaian Premier League football coach)
 Haydn Keenan (film director)
 Nana Akufo-Addo (president of Ghana)
 Jake Obetsebi Lamptey (chairman, New Patriotic Party, Ghana)
 Freddie de Tommaso (singer)

Notable former staff
 Robert Bairamian (cricketer), was headmaster between 1959 and 1975.
 Sir Patrick Moore CBE (astronomer and television presenter)
Bob Woolmer (cricketer)

References

External links
 Holmewood House School website
 Independent Association of Preparatory Schools website
 Ofsted Boarding Inspection Report - February 2009
 Entry in the Good Schools Guide

Preparatory schools in Kent